Birss is a surname. It may refer to:

Colin Birss (born 1964), British judge
Shane Birss (born 1983), Australian rules football player
Viola Birss, Canadian professor of chemistry